Penstemon calycosus, commonly called longsepal beardtongue, is a species of plant in the plantain family (Plantaginaceae). It is native to eastern North America, where it native to the Upper South and Midwestern United States. It expanded its range into the northeast United States in the early 20th century. Its natural habitat is in open woodlands, prairies, and bluffs, often over limestone. 

Penstemon calycosus is an herbaceous perennial, growing to around 3 feet tall. Its flowers are lavender to purple and tubular. It blooms in late spring and early summer, ranging May to July depending on latitude.

Penstemon calycosus is similar to the more widespread Penstemon digitalis. P. calycosus can be distinguished from P. digitalis by its purple flowers and longer, attenuate sepals.

References

calycosus
Flora of the Eastern United States
Flora of the Great Lakes region (North America)
Flora of the United States